Robert Gray (born 8 June 1953) is a Scottish former professional footballer who played for Nottingham Forest, Workington, Airdrie, Blantyre Victoria, Stirling Albion, Alloa Athletic and Albion Rovers, as a midfielder.

References

1953 births
Living people
Scottish footballers
Nottingham Forest F.C. players
Workington A.F.C. players
Airdrieonians F.C. (1878) players
Blantyre Victoria F.C. players
Stirling Albion F.C. players
Alloa Athletic F.C. players
Albion Rovers F.C. players
English Football League players
Scottish Football League players
Association football midfielders